God is American is a 2007 French documentary film written, directed and produced by Richard Martin-Jordan.

Synopsis 
Since the end of World War II  in 1945, the people of Tanna, a remote and isolated island in the south Pacific Ocean, worship an American prophet, John Frum. The islanders believe he is an American pilot that returned to the United States after the end of the world war, and will come back to Tanna with riches and valuable souvenirs from the United States that they call "the cargo". They pray to an American flag, awaiting his return. One man, Isaac the Last One, chief of the "Cargo Cult", claims he is Frum's son. He has formed an army of GIs to celebrate and proclaim the return of the Frum.

Critics 
The shooting of that film was controversial in Vanuatu; the film was accused of being pseudo-anthropological.

Awards
This film was selected in 95 festivals worldwide, it has won 20 awards:

Toulon International Film Festival (Toulon) / France (November 2007) : Jury Special Award 2007
Festival « Etonnant Voyageur » (St-Malo) / France (May 2008) : Winner of a star at the scam (French civil society of multimedia authors)
Honolulu International Film Festival (Honolulu) / Hawaii (Mars 2009) : Gold Kahuna prize for the excellence of filmmaking
The Accolade Competition (La Jolla, Californie) / USA (Avril 2009) : Award of excellence
Mexico International Film Festival (Baja, Californie) / USA (Avril 2009) : Bronze palm award
Twin Rivers Media Festival (Twin Rivers, Caroline du Nord) / USA (Mai 2009) : Fourth place
Yosemite Film Festival (Yosemite, Californie) / USA (Sept 2009) : Silver Sierra Award 2009
The Indie Film Festival (La Jolla, Californie) / USA (Sept 2009) : Award of Merit “honouring outstanding craft and creativity in film”.
Nevada Film Festival (Las Vegas, Nevada) / USA (Oct. 2009) : Golden Reel Award Winner
Mountain Film Festival (Colorado) / USA (Février 2010) : Jury Prize Documentary Competition
Canada international Film Festival (Vancouver) / Canada (Mars 2010) : Award of Excellence in Film Making
Sene film music and arts festival (Rhode Island) / USA (Avril 2010) : Award for Best Documentary Film
Independent Film Awards / USA (2015) Honorable Mention : Winner
WorldFest-Houston International Film Festival (Texas) / USA (Avril 2015) : Gold Remi Winner
ColorTape International Film Festival (Mansfield) / Australie (Avril 2015) : People's Choice Award
Filmmakers World Film Festival – Indonesia (2016) - Diamond Award
HIFF – Headline International Film Festival (Décembre 2015) - Honorable Mention Winner
Java Film Awards – Indonésie (2018) – Golden Award
FICCSUR Southern Cone International Film Festival – Valparaíso/ Chili (Mai 2018) – Prix du Meilleur Documentaire
Eurasia International Film Festival – Moscow September 2018 – Prix du Meilleur Documentaire

References

External links

 https://web.archive.org/web/20110930123041/http://www.fipa.tm.fr/en/programs/2008/dieu-est-americain-16772.htm

2007 films
2007 documentary films
French documentary films
Documentary films about religion
Films about prophets
Films set in Vanuatu
Films shot in Vanuatu
Cargo cults
2000s French films